Pakistan International Airlines Flight 544, a Pakistan International Airlines Fokker F27, was hijacked on 25 May 1998, shortly after it took off from Gwadar International Airport, by three armed men belonging to Baloch Students Organization. The aircraft, with 33 passengers and 5 crew members aboard, had just arrived from Gwadar International Airport, Balochistan, and was set to land in Hyderabad Airport, Sindh. The hijackers demanded that the aircraft be flown to New Delhi, India. The Army's Special Service Group's Haideri Company, 7th Commando Zarrar Battalion, SSG Division, accompanied by members of the Pakistan Rangers, stormed the aircraft, while the Pakistan Police surrounded the plane. The operation concluded with all three hijackers arrested and sentenced to death by Pakistan, with no casualties.

Hijacking of the aircraft 
The incident began while the aircraft was flying, carrying 33 passengers with 5 crew members abroad. The Karachi-bound PIA Fokker Aircraft, Flight PK-554, was hijacked shortly after it took off from Gwadar at 5:35pm on 25 May 1998. The hijackers forced the pilot to fly towards New Delhi, India.

Hijacker's demands
The hijackers had initially asked the pilot to veer the plane towards New Delhi. But, the pilot refused to head towards Delhi on the pretext of fuel shortage and Pakistan Air Force jets had intercepted the aircraft as well. The drama started when the PIA pilot, Captain Uzair Khan, called the Hyderabad Airport general manager after being hijacked. His message addressed Hyderabad Airport as Bhuj Airport, and led the hijackers to believe that they were in Bhuj, India, as he had heard the hijackers talking about maps of Bhuj. The Hyderabad airport staff started pretending to be from Bhuj airport and told the pilot that they were waiting for the plane to land. This communication assured the hijackers that the plane had crossed into India.

Hijackers
The three hijackers were identified as Shahsawar Baloch, Sabir Baloch and Shabir Baloch. They were traveling under the names of Jamal Hussain, Anwer Hussain and Ghulam Hussain.

Timeline

The siege of Flight 544
The plane landed at Hyderabad late at night. The airport manager had switched off the lights and markings of Hyderabad. Later in the night, the hijackers released flight engineer Sajjad Chaudhry to talk to the authorities to refuel the plane for an onward journey to New Delhi, India. The standoff came to an end after seven hours of continuous negotiations led by senior officials of the Pakistan Police. The officials included Senior Superintendent of Police Akhtar Gorchani, Assistant Superintendent of Police Usman Anwar, Deputy Commissioner & District Magistrate Hyderabad Sohail Akbar Shah and Pakistan Rangers Major Aamir Hashmi, at 3 am on Monday. The hijackers demanded food, water, and fuel for the aircraft.

Preparation for the attack
The entire airport was cordoned off by rangers and army personnel. The commandos belonging to the Haideri Company, 7th Commando Zarrar Battalion, SSG Division had been put on alert for a possible storming of the plane. All airport lights had been switched off and the road links to the airport were sealed. In order to deliver water and food, Pakistan police Gorchani and Anwar volunteered and thus police managed to reach the plane, though unarmed.

While the officers stayed in the plane to distract the hijackers, the Special Service Group prepared for the mission. In the meantime, the officers spoke Hindi to each other and convinced the hijackers that they were Indian nationals, as the hijackers had thought that they were in an Indian airport. The two hijackers who identified themselves as Sabir and Shabbir had come out with hand bombs tied on their bodies. The police officers, in order to buy time and earn good will, told the hijackers that the Pakistani embassy people had been summoned to talk to them but, at the same time insisted that they should not hurt the passengers and let the women and children go.

Final assault
The concluding part of the drama started when the hijackers allowed the women, two infants and a child to disembark following negotiations with Anwar, who met them as "Assistant Airport Manager" Ram and Gorchani posing himself as Ashok, manager of the Bhuj Airport. Deputy Commissioner Sohail Akbar Shah, joined the team as DC Rajasthan and communicated with the remaining officers in Hindi. The women and children were evacuated from the aircraft while the officers had remained in the plane. Meanwhile, the Pakistan Army had assigned the mission of Haideri Company, 7th Commando Zarrar Battalion, SSG Division, led by Major Tariq Ahmad Anees and Major Aamir Saleem, codenamed "Commando Operation". By midnight, the elite members SSG had arrived on the scene. They had begun to launch the full-scale operation to neutralize the terrorists. The Pakistan police, ranger and army vehicles were parked in front of the aircraft to prevent it from flying again. The SSG commandos had taken their positions. The SSG stormed the plane, penetrating it from the front and the back doors of the aircraft. The Deputy Commissioner of Police had said Allah ho Akbar (God is great) simultaneously, when the SSG had stormed the plane. Shocked by the slogan, one of the hijackers tried to shoot the deputy commissioner but missed, and the hijacker mistakenly fired at one of his accomplices. The operation lasted less than two minutes. All three hijackers were arrested by the SSG and rushed to Karachi where they were handed over to the Pakistan Police.

Investigation
The hijackers were said to be carrying small weapons - pistols or revolvers, although they showed some packets which they claimed were high intensity explosives. The interrogations revealed that the Baloch hijackers were opposed to nuclear testing in their native Balochistan province following the recent Indian nuclear testing. It was later revealed that hijackers had demanded refueling to proceed to New Delhi. During the siege, the Corps Commander of V Corps, Chief Secretary, Home Secretary, and IG police were at the airport.

Aftermath
The Sindh Governor Lieutenant-General (retired) Moinuddin Haider remained in touch with the authorities throughout the siege. The following week, he honored the Sindh police officers with highest honors and gallantry awards. The hijackers were convicted under 402-B (hijacking code defined in Pakistani law) in 1998 and were given the death penalty in 1999. All hijackers were hanged on 28 May 2015, after 17 years to the day when Pakistan had successfully conducted their nuclear tests in Chaghi, Balochistan.

Pakistan Police
Senior Superintendent of Police  Akhtar Gorchani (Now additional Inspector General (D\AIG)).
Assistant Superintendent of Police Dr. Usman Anwar (Now SSP, awarded Quaid-e-Azam Police Medal for gallantry for this episode later)

Civil officers
Deputy Commissioner (DC) Sohail Shah (disguised himself as DC Rajasthan) (decorated by citizens of Hyderabad).

Accolades
Major Aamir (now Colonel) (decorated with Tamgha-e-Basalat, Army gallantry award)
Major Tariq Ahmad Anees (now Colonel) (decorated with Sitara-e-Jurrat, Army gallantry award)

References

Accidents and incidents involving the Fokker F27
Terrorist incidents in Pakistan in 1998
Hostage taking in Pakistan
Aircraft hijackings in Pakistan
Aviation accidents and incidents in 1998
544
Aircraft hijackings
Operations involving Pakistani special forces
Insurgency in Balochistan
May 1998 events in Asia